Liu Xiang (born July 13, 1983) is a Chinese former 110 meter hurdler. Liu is an Olympic Gold medalist and World Champion. His 2004 Olympic gold medal was the first in a men's track and field event for China.

Liu is one of China's most successful athletes and has emerged as a cultural icon. On top of being the only male athlete in history to be all of 110-metre hurdles World Record Holder, World Champion and Olympic Champion—Liu remains the Olympic record holder for the men's 110-metre hurdles with a time of 12.91 seconds he set back at the 2004 Athens Olympics. He was the favorite to win another gold in the 110 metre hurdles at the Beijing Olympics, but he had to withdraw from competition at the last moment after a false start and aggravation to a previously unrevealed injury. Again a gold medal favourite in the 110 metre hurdles at the London Olympics he pulled his Achilles tendon attempting to clear the first hurdle in the heats. On April 7, 2015, he announced his retirement on Sina Weibo.

Career

Early career
In May 2001, Liu won at the East Asian Games in Osaka, Japan with a time of 13.42 seconds. In August 2001, he won at the Universiade in Beijing, China with a time of 13.33 seconds. He also won at the 2001 National Games of China that same year.

In 2002 Liu set an Asian record time at the Athletissima meeting, completing the event in 13.12 seconds. This also broke Renaldo Nehemiah's long standing and world junior record, which had stood for almost 25 years. The following year he secured bronze medals in the 60 metres hurdles at the 2003 IAAF World Indoor Championships and the 110 m hurdles at the 2003 World Championships in Athletics.

2004 Olympics
In May 2004 at an IAAF Grand Prix race in Osaka, Japan, Liu managed to beat Allen Johnson with a personal best record time of 13.06 seconds. He improved even further at the 2004 Athens Olympics. Although he was not considered a favourite for the event, he won the Olympic final by some distance to pocket the gold medal with 12.91 seconds, tying the world record set by Colin Jackson 11 years before. This was a new Olympic record and was almost three tenths of a second faster than the runner-up Terrence Trammell. The performance had Liu the sixth man to run under 13 seconds for the event and was China's first men's Olympic gold medal in a track and field event. On top of this, it defied the traditional thinking that Asian athletes could not compete in sprint events at the top level. He said that his gold medal "changes the opinion that Asian countries don't get good results in sprint races. I want to prove to all the world that Asians can run very fast."

Liu, a 21-year-old East China Normal University student at the time of victory in Athens, became the target of a bidding war among commercial sponsors. The Chinese Track and Field Association limited him to four such deals.

Liu finished the season with four of the year's ten fastest clockings. Reaching 17 finals in the 60-metre indoor and 110-metre outdoor hurdles, he lost just two, both to American Allen Johnson.

2005 and 2007 World Championships
In August 2005, Liu won a silver medal at the IAAF World Championships in Athletics in Helsinki, Finland, finishing 13.08 seconds, 0.01 second after champion Ladji Doucouré from France.  In November 2005, he won at East Asian Games in Macau, China with 13.21 seconds.

Off track, in May, Liu was awarded the Laureus World Sports Award for Newcomer of the Year for his breakthrough performance at the 2004 Summer Olympics in Athens.

On July 11, 2006, Liu set a new world record in the 110 metre hurdles at the Super Grand Prix in Lausanne with a time of 12.88 seconds (+1.1 m/s tailwind). The record was ratified by the IAAF. In that same race, American Dominique Arnold had also beaten the previous record with a time of 12.90 seconds.
In September, he won gold at IAAF World Athletics Final in Stuttgart, Germany with 12.93 seconds.

On August 31, 2007 at the World Athletics Championships in Osaka, Japan, Liu won gold in the 110-metre hurdles with 12.95 seconds to become World Champion.

On May 23, Liu participated in a test event at the Beijing National Stadium. He pulled out of the Reebok Grand Prix in New York on May 31, citing hamstring problems. On June 8, he false-started at the Prefontaine Classic at Eugene, Oregon. Liu skipped the entire European circuit, preferring to train for the Olympics in China instead.

Beijing Olympics
Leading up to the Summer Olympics in Beijing, China, Liu bore national expectations of a repeat victory on home soil. On August 18, Liu withdrew from the Olympic 110 metre hurdles. He walked off the track after a false start by another runner in his first-round heat, leaving the crowd at the Beijing National Stadium in stunned silence, confusion, and tears. According to Jeré Longman of The New York Times, "China's greatest hope had been dashed".

According to China's track and field association, Liu suffered from a recurrence of chronic inflammation in his right Achilles tendon. Liu's coach, Sun Haiping addressed the media during a press conference and stated that the hurdler had been hampered by a tendon injury for six or seven years. He commented on the situation, saying "We worked hard every day, but the result was as you see and it is really hard to take." Sun, who was in tears for most of the press conference, stated that Liu would be unable to compete for the remainder of 2008.  Liu made a public apology to the Chinese media the following day, saying he could "do nothing but pull out of the race" because of his foot injury. He believed that the injury would not prevent him from future competitions and vowed to "come back" for the next Olympics.

Liu's injury was significant and also ruled him out of the following year's major competition, the 2009 World Championships in Athletics. However, coach Sun Haiping was confident that he would return in time for the Chinese national championships and 2009 Asian Championships in Athletics in November.

2009–2011: Return from injury
After a 13-month absence because of his injury, Liu finally returned to competition at the Shanghai Golden Grand Prix.  Liu recorded a time of 13.15, tied with Terrence Trammell, but finished 0.01 second behind and was awarded second place.  However, Liu said he was happy with his performance. Nearing the end of the year, he competed at a number of major events on home turf. He won gold medals at the 2009 Asian Athletics Championships, the East Asian Games and the 11th Chinese National Games.

At the 2010 IAAF World Indoor Championships in Doha, admitting that his right foot has yet to fully recover, Liu was able to finish in the finals of the 60 m hurdles, but managed only seventh place. His sole appearance on the 2010 IAAF Diamond League circuit came at the Shanghai Grand Prix and he lost to national rival Shi Dongpeng for the first time. Following a six-month break, he marked his return to form at the 2010 Asian Games. A crowd of 70,000 gathered at the Guangdong Olympic Stadium to see him in the final and he easily won his third consecutive title at the competition, breaking the Games record with a run of 13.09 seconds – making him the third fastest athlete that season.

The Shanghai Golden Grand Prix in May 2011 saw Liu make a return to a world class level: he defeated David Oliver (the fastest hurdler in 2010) with a world-leading mark of 13.07 seconds to take his first win on the 2011 IAAF Diamond League. Liu showed he had accomplished a transition in his technique, as he reduced his number of starting steps before the first hurdle from eight to seven, using his left leg for hurdling.

On August 29, 2011, Liu Xiang competed in the men's 110-metre hurdles final in the IAAF World Championships in Daegu, South Korea. Liu finished the race in third place, but he eventually won the silver medal, as the winner Dayron Robles was disqualified for entering Liu's lane and pulling him back.

2012 season
In Liu's first competition of 2012, he was matched up against Dayron Robles at the Birmingham Indoor Grand Prix and this time he won cleanly with an Asian record time of 7.41 seconds for the 60 m hurdles. He was the favourite for the title at the 2012 IAAF World Indoor Championships, but was beaten into second place by Aries Merritt and left with the silver medal. In the outdoor season he set a 110 m hurdles meet record at the Golden Grand Prix Kawasaki, then ran 12.97 seconds to win at his home nation 2012 IAAF Diamond League meet, the Shanghai Golden Grand Prix. This was his first run under 13 seconds since 2007, and he beat Americans David Oliver and Jason Richardson by some distance. He followed this with a run of 12.87 seconds to win at the Prefontaine Classic, matching the world record time albeit with wind-assistance of 2.4 m/s.

In the 110-metre hurdles at the London Olympics in 2012, Liu pulled his Achilles tendon while taking off and attempting to clear the first hurdle, instead crashing straight into it. Liu hopped the full 110 metre stretch, was helped by a few of his fellow competitors, and was put into a wheel chair and led away. He kissed the last hurdle before he left the track. Colin Jackson described it as a "very sad sight indeed" for the sport. Liu's loss echoed strongly in the Chinese press but also sparked a lot of controversies. Some voices expressed support while others wondered why Liu chose to participate in spite of his injury. Liu even earned a nickname "Liu PaoPao" because of pullbacks in two consecutive Olympic Games. As per reports Liu was to have surgery on his Achilles tendon in Britain.

Retirement 
On April 7, 2015, Liu announced his retirement in a statement posted to his Sina Weibo. He had not competed since the 2012 Olympic race.  In his post, he wrote that he was retiring after two years of frustrating and ultimately futile rehabilitation: "Of course my heart is still willing, but my foot has again and again said no to me."

In 2016, Liu was chosen as one of the teams in Shenzhen TV's reality program The Amazing Race China 3. Liu was initially paired up with his cousin Ji Longxiang on the first two legs, but Ji was later replaced with his best friend Xu Qifeng for the remainder of the race. They finished in 3rd place overall.

Personal life
Liu is known for his low-profile appearance, but he has become one of the most popular athletes in China. 
Liu Xiang was on Time magazine Asian edition's cover of the 2008 Summer Olympic Games titled "Liu Xiang & 99 More Athletes to Watch."

Liu donated approximately 2,500,000 yuan (364,000 USD) to 2008 Sichuan earthquake relief efforts.

Liu married Ge Tian, a post-90s generation actress on September 7, 2014, after officially dating the actress for two years prior to their marriage.
 They divorced in 2015. On January 9, 2016, Liu Xiang announced a new relationship with pole vaulter Wu Sha, in his Sina Weibo. On December 1, 2016, Liu and Wu held a low profile wedding ceremony in Fiji.

Liu's athletic gear is sponsored by Nike. He is also a spokesperson for Coca-Cola and Cadillac.

International competition record

See also
China at the 2004 Summer Olympics
China at the 2008 Summer Olympics
China at the World Championships in Athletics
First Track & Field Gold medal for India

References

External links
Official website
SPIKES Hero profile on www.spikesmag.com

1983 births
Living people
Runners from Shanghai
Chinese male hurdlers
World record setters in athletics (track and field)
Olympic athletes of China
Athletes (track and field) at the 2004 Summer Olympics
Athletes (track and field) at the 2008 Summer Olympics
Olympic gold medalists for China
Asian Games medalists in athletics (track and field)
East China Normal University alumni
Laureus World Sports Awards winners
Athletes (track and field) at the 2012 Summer Olympics
World Athletics Championships medalists
Athletes (track and field) at the 2002 Asian Games
Athletes (track and field) at the 2006 Asian Games
Athletes (track and field) at the 2010 Asian Games
Medalists at the 2004 Summer Olympics
Asian Games gold medalists for China
Olympic gold medalists in athletics (track and field)
Medalists at the 2002 Asian Games
Medalists at the 2006 Asian Games
Medalists at the 2010 Asian Games
Universiade medalists in athletics (track and field)
Universiade gold medalists for China
World Athletics Indoor Championships winners
World Athletics Championships winners
Members of the 11th Chinese People's Political Consultative Conference
Members of the 12th Chinese People's Political Consultative Conference
Medalists at the 2001 Summer Universiade
The Amazing Race contestants